The Colquepata District is one of six districts of the province Paucartambo in Peru.

Geography 
Other mountains are listed below:

Ethnic groups 
The people in the district are mainly indigenous citizens of Quechua descent. Quechua is the language which the majority of the population (97.87%) learnt to speak in childhood, 1.74 	% of the residents started speaking using the Spanish language (2007 Peru Census).

See also 
 Ninamarka

References